The Devil's Bris is the debut album by the dark cabaret/dark wave artist Voltaire. It was released in 1998 by Projekt Records. The album's title is derived from the figure of the devil and the Jewish circumcision ritual, the bris milah.

The tracks "Ex-Lover's Lover" and "When You're Evil" also appear on Voltaire's greatest hits album Deady Sings! Live versions of the tracks "Ex-Lover's Lover" and "When You're Evil" appear on Voltaire's live album Live!

"When You're Evil" is featured in the horror film 100 Tears, as well as in Deady, a minigame on ebilgames.com.

The cover features Voltaire's face on a black background.

Track listing

External links
 The Devil's Bris on Projekt Records' official website

Voltaire (musician) albums
Projekt Records albums
1998 debut albums